This is a list of the Carlos Palanca Memorial Awards for Literature winners in the year 1973 (rank, title of winning entry, name of author).

English division
Short story
First prize: “Spots on Their Wings and Other Stories” by Antonio R. Enriquez
Second prize: “On Friends You Pin Such Hopes” by Ines Taccad Cammayo
Third prize: “The Liberation of Mrs. Fidela Magsilang” by Jaime An Lim

Poetry
First prize: “Charts” by Cirilo F. Bautista
Second prize: “A Trick of Mirrors” by Rolando S. Tinio
Third prize: “Alapaap's Mountain” by Erwin Castillo

One-Act Play
First prize: “The Heart of Emptiness is Black” by Ricaredo Demetillo
Second prize: “Go, Rider” by Azucena Grajo Uranza
Third prize: “The Ricebird Has Brown Wings” by Federico Licsi Espino Jr.; and “The Boxes” by Rolando S. Tinio

Filipino division
Short story
First prize: “Ang Daong ni Noe” by Pedro S. Dandan
Second prize: “Puwang sa Lilim ng Araw” by Bienvenido Ramos
Third prize: “Isang Lumang Kuwento” by Jun Cruz Reyes

Poetry
First prize: “Walang Pangalan ang Maraming Dakila” by Eduardo Garrovillas
Second prize: “Pakikipagtipan sa Tadhana” by Bienvenido Ramos
Third prize: “Dalit-puri at Iba Pang Tula” by Ruth Elynia S. Mabanglo

One-act play
First prize: “Si Jesus at si Magdalena” by Ruth Elynia S. Mabanglo
Second prize: “Ang Daga sa Hawla” by Wilfredo Pa. Virtusio
Third prize: “Maskara” by Frank G. Rivera

References
 

Palanca Awards
1973 literary awards